Rear Admiral Douglas Faure is a former South African naval officer.

Military career

He served as the first commanding officer of SAS Spioenkop. until 2008 when he was appointed Senior Staff Officer Combat Support. He was appointed Officer Commanding of SAS Simonsberg on 1 October 2008.

He served as Director Maritime Warfare on 1 April 2017 till 1 June 2020, when he was promoted to Deputy Chief of the Navy.

Awards and decorations

References

South African admirals
Living people
Year of birth missing (living people)